The 1981 Vuelta a España was the 36th edition of the Vuelta a España, one of cycling's Grand Tours. The Vuelta began in Santander, with a prologue individual time trial on 21 April, and Stage 10 occurred on 1 May with a stage from Murcia. The race finished in Madrid on 10 May.

Stage 10
1 May 1981 — Murcia to Almussafes,

Stage 11
2 May 1981 — Almussafes to Peniscola,

Stage 12
3 May 1981 — Peniscola to Esparreguera,

Stage 13
4 May 1981 — Esparreguera to Rasos de Peguera,

Stage 14
5 May 1981 — Gironella to Balaguer,

Stage 15a
6 May 1981 — Balaguer to Alfajarín,

Stage 15b
6 May 1981 — Zaragoza to Zaragoza,  (ITT)

Stage 16
7 May 1981 — Calatayud to Torrejón de Ardoz,

Stage 17
8 May 1981 — Torrejón de Ardoz to Segovia,

Stage 18
9 May 1981 — Segovia – ,

Stage 19
10 May 1981 — Madrid to Madrid,

References

1981 Vuelta a España
Vuelta a España stages